The 1978 Five Nations Championship was the forty-ninth series of the rugby union Five Nations Championship. Including the previous incarnations as the Home Nations and Five Nations, this was the eighty-fourth series of the northern hemisphere rugby union championship. Ten matches were played between 21 January and 18 March. The tournament was contested by England, France, Ireland, Scotland, and Wales. The championship was won by Wales, their twentieth outright win in the competition. The Welsh had shared another nine titles with other teams. Having won all four of their games, Wales also won the Grand Slam for a record eighth time - Wales had formerly shared the record of seven with England. Victories over England, Ireland and Scotland (the Home Nations), also meant Wales won the Triple Crown for the third consecutive time, a record, given no other team had ever won the Triple Crown more than twice in a row. It was Wales' fifteenth in total, also a record, surpassing the fourteen won by England.

The tournament was the first Five Nations Championship in which two teams each with three victories faced off against each other in the final round of matches, with both capable of completing a Grand Slam with a victory.

Participants
The teams involved were:

Table

Squads

Results

References
1978 Five Nations results

External links

The official RBS Six Nations Site

Six Nations Championship seasons
Five Nations
Five Nations
Five Nations
Five Nations
Five Nations
Five Nations
 
Five Nations
Five Nations
Five Nations